Sinclair House may refer to:

Upton Sinclair House, Monrovia, California, listed on the National Register of Historic Places (NRHP)
Reginald Sinclaire House, Larkspur, Colorado, NRHP-listed
Dr. Archibald Neil Sinclair House, Honolulu, Hawaii, NRHP-listed
T. M. Sinclair Mansion, Cedar Rapids, Iowa, NRHP-listed
Harry F. Sinclair House, New York, New York, NRHP-listed
Sinclair House (Manhattan hotel) (c.1787-1908), New York, New York

See also
Sinclair Building (disambiguation)
Sinclair Service Station (disambiguation)